The Mediterranean Games records in athletics set by athletes who are representing one of the nations bordering the Mediterranean Sea at the Mediterranean Games. Records are recognised by International Mediterranean Games Committee (CIJM) and have been updated after the last Games, held in Mersin, Turkey in 2013.

Men's records

Women's records

References

External links

Mediterranean Game
Athletics
Records